Chimwala Munilall (17 August 1948 – 12 April 2017) was a Guyanese cricketer. He played in one List A and thirteen first-class matches for Guyana from 1968 to 1978.

See also
 List of Guyanese representative cricketers

References

External links
 

1948 births
2017 deaths
Guyanese cricketers
Guyana cricketers